The endorheic chub (Evarra tlahuacensis) is an extinct species of ray-finned fish in the family Cyprinidae.
It was found only in Mexico.

Sources 

Evarra
Fish described in 1902
Fish of North America becoming extinct since 1500
Endemic fish of Mexico
Freshwater fish of Mexico
Taxonomy articles created by Polbot